Let's Go Bobo! is an album by jazz percussionist Willie Bobo released in 1964 and his last on the Roulette label.

Reception

Allmusic awarded the album 4 stars.

Track listing
All compositions by Teacho Wiltshire except as indicated
 "Let's Go Bobo" (Gus Tillman, Joe James) - 2:47
 "Caribe" (Willie "Bobo" Corea) - 2:45
 "Twist The Monkey's Tail" (David Burns) - 2:45
 "Tell It Like It Is" (Burns) - 2:45
 "Get Crackin'" - 2:45
 "Wild Rice" - 2:30
 "The Hip Monkey" - 3:31
 "Trinidad" - 2:55
 "Timbale Groove" - 2:45
 "Go Go Go" - 2:37
 "Be's The Other Way" (Burns) - 2:22
 "A La Bobo" (Burns, Corea) - 2:52

Personnel
Willie Bobo - drums, timbales, percussion
Unidentified Orchestra

References

Roulette Records albums
Willie Bobo albums
1964 albums
Albums produced by Teddy Reig